Typhis is a genus of sea snails, marine gastropod mollusks in the family Muricidae, the murex snails or rock snails.

Species
Species within the genus Typhis include:
 † Typhis aculeatus Vella, 1961 
 † Typhis adventus Vella, 1961 
 † Typhis bantamensis Oostingh, 1933
 † Typhis chattonensis P. A. Maxwell, 1971 
 † Typhis clifdenensis Vella, 1961 
 † Typhis cuniculosus Duchâtel in Bronn, 1848
 † Typhis gabbi Brown & Pilsbry, 1911
 † Typhis hebetatus Hutton, 1877 
 Typhis phillipensis Watson, 1883
 † Typhis planus Vella, 1961 
 † Typhis ramosus Habe & Kosuge, 1971
 † Typhis sejunctus Semper, 1861
 † Typhis tubifer Bruguière, 1792
 Typhis wellsi Houart, 1985
 Typhis westaustralis Houart, 1991

Synonyms
 † Typhis coronarius Deshayes, 1865: synonym of  †Laevityphis muticus (J. de C. Sowerby, 1835) 
 † Typhis francescae Finlay, 1924: synonym of † Rugotyphis francescae (Finlay, 1924)  (original combination)
 Typhis trispinosus (Houart, 1991): synonym of Hirtotyphis trispinosus Houart, 1991
 Typhis tityrus Bayer, 1971: synonym of Trubatsa tityrus (Bayer, 1971) (basionym)
 Typhis tosaensis Azuma, 1960: synonym  of Monstrotyphis tosaensis (M. Azuma, 1960)

References

 
Muricidae